The following is a list of media in Toledo, Ohio, which includes local cable and broadcast television stations, radio stations, and newspapers which are received by people living in the Toledo, Ohio, region. Not included are radio and television stations from Detroit and Windsor, Ontario, which reach most of the city and surrounding area.

Newspapers

Local
 The Blade
 Toledo Free Press (defunct)

Regional
 Detroit Free Press
 The Detroit News

Cable
 Buckeye Broadband

Radio

A number of radio stations are broadcast from and/or are licensed to the Toledo market, including the following:

AM 
 730 WJYM Bowling Green (Contemporary Christian)*
 1230 WCWA Toledo (Sports)
 1370 WSPD Toledo (Talk)
 1520 WPAY Rossford (Silent)
 1560 WWYC Toledo (CSN International)*

FM 
Asterisk (*) indicates a non-commercial (public radio/campus/educational) broadcast.

 88.3 WXTS-FM Toledo (Jazz)*
 88.3 WXUT Toledo (College/alternative)*
 88.9 WTPG Whitehouse (Contemporary Christian-WBCL)*
 89.3 WYSZ Maumee (Christian rock/hip hop)*
 89.7 WNOC Bowling Green (Annunciation Radio)*
 90.3 WOTL Toledo (Family Radio)*
 91.3 WGTE-FM Toledo (NPR/classical)*
 92.5 WVKS Toledo (Contemporary hit radio)
 93.5 WRQN Bowling Green (Classic hits)
 94.5 WXKR Port Clinton (Classic rock)
 95.7 WIMX Gibsonburg (Urban AC)
 96.9 WNKL Wauseon (K-Love)*
 97.3 WJZE Oak Harbor (Urban contemporary)
 98.3 WMIM Luna Pier (Country)
 99.9 WKKO Toledo (Country)
 101.5 WRVF Toledo (Adult contemporary)
 102.3 WPOS Holland Christian contemporary (Moody Radio)*
 103.7 WCKY-FM Pemberville (Country)
 104.7 WIOT Toledo (Mainstream rock)
 105.5 WQQO Sylvania (Contemporary hit radio)
 106.5 WTOD Delta (Christian)
 107.3 WJUC Swanton (Urban AC)
 107.7 WPFX Luckey (Country)

LPFM 
 96.5 WVZC-LP Toledo (Community/Spanish/variety)*
 97.7 WNLB-LP Holland (Community/oldies)*
 106.1 WAKT-LP Toledo (Community)*

Internet Radio 

 Towpath Radio Grand Rapids (Oldies)
 Sweet 419 Toledo (90s and 2K Pop)
 WSYL Sylvania (Adult Contemporary)
 River Rat Country Grand Rapids (Country)

Television

Broadcast
Television stations that primarily serve Toledo, Ohio, include:

 11 WTOL Toledo (CBS)
 13 WTVG Toledo (ABC/The CW)
 24 WNWO-TV Toledo (NBC)
 27 WBGU-TV Bowling Green (PBS)
 30 WGTE-TV Toledo (PBS)
 36 WUPW Toledo (Fox)
 40 WLMB Toledo (Religious independent)
 48 WMNT-CD Toledo (MyNetworkTV)

Low Power stations (containing "LP" or numbers in their calls) had to move, due to digital station conversions on a specific station number, or the channel they are broadcasting on is being withdrawn from television broadcasting. Therefore, the station on that channel had to move to another channel number.

Cable
 Buckeye Cable Sports Network
 Toledo 5 (defunct)

References

Toledo, Ohio